The 2014 NCAA Division I Tennis Championships were the men's and women's tennis tournaments played concurrently from May 16 to May 21, 2014 in Athens, Georgia on the campus of the University of Georgia. It was the 69th edition of the NCAA Division I Men's Tennis Championship and the 33rd edition of the NCAA Division I Women's Tennis Championship. It was the ninth time the men's and women's tournaments were held at the same venue. It consisted of a men's and women's team, singles, and doubles championships.

Women's championship

The UCLA Bruins defeated North Carolina 4–3 to win their third national title. The team was coached by Stella Sampras, the sister of Pete Sampras. Their last championship was won in 2008. Danielle Collins from the University of Virginia won the singles title, and the team of Maya Jansen and Erin Routliffe from the University of Alabama won the doubles title.

References

NCAA Division I tennis championships
NCAA Division I Tennis Championships
NCAA Division I Tennis
NCAA Division I tennis championships
Tennis tournaments in Georgia (U.S. state)